Woolavington is a village and civil parish on the Somerset Levels in the English county of Somerset. At the 2021 census it had a population of 2,325.

History
 the settlement of Hunlaf's people and was known as Hunlavintone in the Domesday Book of 1086. The parish of Woolavington was part of the Whitley Hundred,

Close to the village is the Royal Ordnance Factory ROF Bridgwater, a factory which produced high explosives for munitions from 1941 until its closure in 2008.

Governance
The parish council has responsibility for local issues, including setting an annual precept (local rate) to cover the council’s operating costs and producing annual accounts for public scrutiny. The parish council evaluates local planning applications and works with the local police, district council officers, and neighbourhood watch groups on matters of crime, security, and traffic. The parish council's role also includes initiating projects for the maintenance and repair of parish facilities, as well as consulting with the district council on the maintenance, repair, and improvement of highways, drainage, footpaths, public transport, and street cleaning. Conservation matters (including trees and listed buildings) and environmental issues are also the responsibility of the council.

The village falls within the Non-metropolitan district of Sedgemoor, which was formed on 1 April 1974 under the Local Government Act 1972, having previously been part of Bridgwater Rural District, which is responsible for local planning and building control, local roads, council housing, environmental health, markets and fairs, refuse collection and recycling, cemeteries and crematoria, leisure services, parks, and tourism.

Somerset County Council is responsible for running the largest and most expensive local services such as education, social services, libraries, main roads, public transport, policing and  fire services, trading standards, waste disposal and strategic planning.

It is also part of the Bridgwater and West Somerset county constituency represented in the House of Commons of the Parliament of the United Kingdom. It elects one Member of Parliament (MP) by the first past the post system of election.

Religious sites
The Anglican parish Church of St Mary has 11th-century origins and is a Grade I listed building. In the early 12th century it was granted to Goldcliff Priory in Monmouthshire by its founder Robert de Chandos who was lord of the manor of Woolavington. In the 15th century it passed to the cannons of Windsor.

Notable residents
In 1807  it was the birthplace of the Reverend George Andrew Jacob and in 1812 his brother John Jacob, who became a British army officer.

References

External links

Somerset Levels
Villages in Sedgemoor
Civil parishes in Somerset